The band Love Army was a Mexican rock band that emerged from “Chicano Wave” (La Onda Chicana in Spanish) in the early 1970s. The band Love Army derived from the Tijuana Five and was formed by Alberto Isordia ( El Pajaro), Salvador Martinez, Jaime Valle (a.k.a. El Perro), Fernando Vahaux, Ernesto Hernandez (a.k.a. El Blu), Mario Rojas (a.k.a. El Muerto), Enrique Sida and Chuy Sida.

Background
In the late 1960s a wave of Mexican rock heavily influenced by jazz-rock and funk rock emerged in several northern border Mexican states, in particular in Tijuana, Baja California. This coalesced into the musical/cultural movement known as La Onda (The Wave).

Love Army in the early 1970s

Caminata Cerebral
Caminata Cerebral written and arranged by Jaime Valle (a.k.a. El Perro) and vocalist Alberto Isordia (a.k.a. El Pajaro) reflected the state of the Mexican counterculture and the position of the Mexican youth against the government of that time. It was also recorded in English (Walk Within My Brain).

Festival de Rock y Ruedas de Avandaro
Love Army was one of the bands announced to perform in the Avandaro Rock y Ruedas (Rock and Wheels) Festival. Later the album The Love Army en Avandaro was released

The Acapulco era at the Tiberio's
After the success of hits like: Walk within my brain, The Door is open to your heart (Tambien tu tiempo llegara) and I will be in love, the band spent several months performing at the Tiberio's bar in Acapulco, Mexico.

Other songs of the Love army group are: "Di por que" " I will be in love" "Mañana" "Ser libre" "Tal Vez" " The door is open to your heart" " Tu eres mi amor
"Tu tiempo llegará" y "Caminata Cerebral" Versions in Spanish and English.

The public broadcasting of the song "Caminata Cerebral" a.k.a. "Walk Within My Brain", was forbidden by Mexican law due to "subversive lyrics".

External links

Other photos on the Love Army presentations

Mexican rock music groups
Musical groups from Tijuana